"Dream Again" is a 2020 single by Lea Salonga.

Dream Again may also refer to:

 Dream Again (Phil Keaggy album), 2006
 Dream Again (Lili Añel album), 2007
 Dream Again Tour, a 2022 concert tour by Lea Salonga